In mathematics, a convolution quotient is to the operation of convolution as a quotient of integers is to multiplication.

The kind of convolution  with which this theory is concerned is defined by

 

A consequence is that if  are continuous on  then  only if  This fact makes it possible to define convolution quotients by saying that for two functions ƒ, g, the pair (ƒ, g) has the same convolution quotient as the pair (h * ƒ,h * g).

Convolution quotients are used in an approach to making Dirac's delta function and other generalized functions logically rigorous.

References

Generalized functions